Shuan Hern Lee (simplified Chinese: 李宣恒; traditional Chinese: 李宣恆; pinyin: Lǐ Xuānhéng); born 19 July 2002) is a Chinese-Australian classical pianist.

Early life 
Shuan Hern Lee was born in Perth, Western Australia to parents Yoon Sen Lee and Ivy Chan. Both his parents are also pianists, his father (Yoon Sen Lee) from Singapore and mother (Ivy Chan) from China.

Shuan started his musical journey when he was just 2 and a half years old. He was quick to pick up playing piano, and was one of the semi-finalists of Australia's Got Talent in 2010, at the age of 7, and Voice Kids Australia in 2014, where he sang Pie Jesu. When he was 9, he had obtained his Associate Diploma of the Trinity College of London (ATCL) in piano performance then went on to obtain his Associated Board of the Royal Schools of Music and the Licentiate in Music, Australia (LMusA), both with Distinction in piano performance, at the age of 10. When he was 14, he obtained the Fellowship in Music, Australia (FMusA) diploma in piano performance of the AMEB.

Age 16, Shuan is studying a music degree at the University of Western Australia.

Career 
Lee has performed with many orchestras including: National Symphony Orchestra of Ukraine, Minnesota Symphony Orchestra, Armenia State Philharmonic Orchestra, Armenia State Chamber Orchestra, Novosibirsk Philharmonic Orchestra, Imola Chamber Orchestra, Fremantle Symphony Orchestra, Perth Symphony Orchestra, Metropolitan Symphony Orchestra (Perth), and West Australian Symphony Orchestra

Competitions and awards 

2012:

1st prize:

 Chopin International Piano Competition (Hartford, Connecticut, USA)

2013:

1st prize:

 Astana Piano Passion, Kazakhstan
 Sberbank Debut International Piano Competition Ukraine

2nd prize:

 Horowitz International Piano Competition, Ukraine.

2014:

 AMP Tomorrow's Maker Fund Award Recipient (Youngest)

2015:

1st prize + Tchaikovsky Prize:

 Young Pianist of the North International Piano Competition in UK

5th prize

 Youngest finalist at International Tchaikovsky Competition for Young Musicians in Novosibirsk
2016:

1st prize:

 San Marino International Piano Competition (15 and under)
 International Piano Competition for Young Musicians in Enschede, The Netherlands (+Audience Prize)

2017:

1st prize:

 International Junior E-Piano Competition in Minnesota USA(+Best Variations prize)

2019:

 Winner of Cliburn International Junior Piano Competition in Dallas, Texas

Albums 
Shuan Hern has recorded three CD albums, Musical Adventures 1 (2011) and Musical Adventures 2(2014)and had his latest album in 2019, Grand Prix du Concours International de Piano “Ville de Gagny”, released by Musideco Classical and available on Spotify. Grand Prix du Concours International de Piano “Ville de Gagny”, (Édition 2019 [Live Recording])

Personal life 
Shuan is a student of the International Piano Academy In contri Col Maestro of Imola, Italy and is currently studying with Yoon Sen Lee and Ingrid Fliter.

His hobbies are playing table tennis and nerf guns, and also loves writing poetry and studying philosophy.

His favourite composers are Johann Sebastian Bach and Chopin.

References

External links 
 Official website: shuanhernlee.net

2002 births
Living people
21st-century Chinese musicians
21st-century classical pianists
21st-century male musicians
Chinese classical pianists
Australian classical pianists
Child classical musicians
Male classical pianists
People's Republic of China musicians